Ray E. Eubanks (February 6, 1922 – July 23, 1944) was a United States Army soldier and a recipient of the United States military's highest decoration — the Medal of Honor — for his actions in World War II.

Biography
Eubanks joined the Army from La Grange, North Carolina in 1942, and by July 23, 1944, was serving as a Sergeant in Company D, 503rd Parachute Infantry Regiment. On that day, on the island of Noemfoor in Dutch New Guinea, Sgt. Eubanks single-handedly assaulted an enemy position with a Browning Automatic Rifle (BAR).  Although he was wounded and his BAR disabled during his approach, he nevertheless charged the position, using his gun as a club to kill several Japanese soldiers until he was himself killed. For these actions, he was posthumously awarded the Medal of Honor eight months later, on March 29, 1945.

Eubanks, aged 22 at his death, was buried in Westview Cemetery, Kinston, North Carolina.

Medal of Honor citation
Sergeant Eubanks' official Medal of Honor citation reads:

See also

List of Medal of Honor recipients
List of Medal of Honor recipients for World War II

References

1922 births
1944 deaths
People from Snow Hill, North Carolina
Military personnel from North Carolina
United States Army personnel killed in World War II
United States Army Medal of Honor recipients
People from La Grange, North Carolina
United States Army soldiers
World War II recipients of the Medal of Honor